Badisches Volksecho ('Baden People's Echo') was a German language weekly newspaper. It was published from Stuttgart, West Germany between April 1946 and March 1947. Later it was published from Mannheim, Karlsruhe and Stuttgart, West Germany between April, 1947 to August 11, 1956. It was published by the regional organization of the Communist Party of Germany in Württemberg-Baden. Albeit initially planned as an organ for northern Baden, it became distributed in the French occupation zone as well after the banning of the south Baden organ Unser Tag.

On August 12, 1950 publishing of Badisches Volksecho was suspended by the U.S. military authorities for a period of 90 days, for having printed material deemed 'prejudicial to the prestige of the Allied forces'.

As of 1955, the newspaper had a circulation of around 16,000. Badisches Volkecho was banned in 1956.

References

1946 establishments in Germany
1956 disestablishments in West Germany
Communist newspapers
Communist Party of Germany
Defunct newspapers published in Germany
Defunct weekly newspapers
German-language communist newspapers
Mass media in Mannheim
Mass media in Stuttgart
Weekly newspapers published in Germany
Newspapers established in 1946
Publications disestablished in 1956